Saving Angelo is a 2007 Dominic Scott Kay-directed short film based on the true events of a white boxer that he and his family rescued in 2003. All promotions and earnings went to animal charity projects.

In January 2007, Kay filed a lawsuit claiming that producer Conroy Kanter "unfairly demanded creative control and distribution rights" for the film. The suit was settled out of court with  Kay receiving "full ownership and control" of the film, along with a $20,000 donation to Crusades for Animals.

Credited cast

Awards and nominations

References

External links 
 

2007 films
American short films
2000s English-language films